The Men's Double Advanced Metric Round Tetraplegic was an archery competition in the 1984 Summer Paralympics.

The Austrian competitor, Gerhard Frank, won the gold medal.

Results

References

1984 Summer Paralympics events